Stephen John Perks (19 April 1963 – 28 April 2021) was an English professional footballer who played as a goalkeeper.

Early life
Born in Bridgnorth, Perks attended William Brookes School in Much Wenlock, leaving at the age of 16.

Career
After making his debut for the club in the Welsh Cup in February 1982, Perks made 243 appearances in the Football League for Shrewsbury Town, and 292 appearances in all competitions. He later played non-league football for Torquay United, Telford United and Stafford Rangers.

He also played cricket for Much Wenlock Cricket Club.

Later life and death
After retiring from football Perks worked as an estate agent in Shrewsbury, before dying on 28 April 2021 aged 58. He was survived by two children.

References

1963 births
2021 deaths
English footballers
Shrewsbury Town F.C. players
Torquay United F.C. players
Telford United F.C. players
Stafford Rangers F.C. players
English Football League players
Association football goalkeepers
British estate agents (people)
People from Bridgnorth